Camoca (variant: Camoca de Arriba; Camoca de Abajo) is one of 41 parishes (administrative divisions) in Villaviciosa, a municipality within the province and autonomous community of Asturias, in northern Spain. 

Villages and hamlets
 La Bustariega
 Camoca de Abajo
 Camoca de Arriba
 El Campo
 La Corolla
 El Llano
 El Monte
 Peruyero
 La Piñera
 Reborión
 La Riega
 Ronzón
 El Travieso
 El Valle
 Vega

References

Parishes in Villaviciosa